Cole Perry Dasilva (born 11 May 1999) is a professional footballer who plays as a full back for  club Royston Town.

Dasilva is a product of the Chelsea and Luton Town academies and began his professional career with Brentford in 2018. Following his release in 2020 and spell with Leicester City U23, Dasilva transferred to Croatian club HNK Šibenik in 2021. He returned to England in 2022 and dropped into non-League football. Born in England, Dasilva was capped by England and Wales at youth international level.

Club career

Chelsea 
Initially a left winger, Dasilva began his career at hometown club Luton Celtic, playing alongside his brothers Rio and Jay under his father's management. The brothers later entered the youth system at Luton Town and were a part of the U11 team which beat a Bayern Munich youth team in the 2009 Final of the five-a-side Aarau Masters. The brothers transferred to the Chelsea academy for a combined £1 million fee in January 2012. Dasilva began a scholarship in 2015 and progressed to sign a professional contract in June 2016, signing a one-year extension a year later. He had a successful youth career with the club, developing into a full back and winning the 2015–16 U18 Premier League and the 2015–16 FA Youth Cup. He also made three appearances in Chelsea's 2017–18 UEFA Youth League-winning campaign and made two EFL Trophy appearances for the U23 team. Dasilva was released at the end of the 2017–18 season.

Brentford 
On 7 August 2018, Dasilva joined the B team at Championship club Brentford on a two-year contract for an undisclosed fee, with the option of a further year. He made 41 appearances and scored seven goals during the 2018–19 season and was a part of the team which won the 2018–19 Middlesex Senior Cup. During the 2019–20 pre-season, Dasilva was included in the first team squad for its training camp in Austria, but was largely frozen out of the B team during the regular season and was released when his contract expired in June 2020.

HNK Šibenik 
After playing the final three months of the 2020–21 season with Leicester City U23 as a free agent, Dasilva signed a contract with Croatian First League club HNK Šibenik on 27 June 2021. On 6 September, it was reported that Dasilva had finally been registered to play for the club and made the first senior appearance of his career late in the month, with a start in a 1–0 Croatian Cup first round win over NK Međimurje. After the winter break, Dasilva failed to win a call into a matchday squad and departed the club in March 2022. He ended his spell with six appearances.

Non-League football 
On 8 March 2022, Dasilva signed an undisclosed-length contract with National League South club Oxford City. During what remained of the 2021–22 season, Dasilva made 8 appearances and was a part of the Oxfordshire Senior Cup-winning squad, but he did not feature in the Hoops' unsuccessful playoff campaign. Dasilva signed a contract with National League South club Hemel Hempstead Town in July 2022, but after making six appearances during the first seven weeks of the 2022–23 season, he was released to join Southern League Premier Division Central club Royston Town in September 2022.

International career 
Dasilva was capped by Wales at U15, U16, U17, U19, U20 and U21 level and England at U16 level. He was a part of Wales' 2014–15 Victory Shield-winning team, but was not included in the squad for the deciding match versus Northern Ireland. Dasilva made a single appearance during the U20 team's 2017 Toulon Tournament campaign.

Personal life 
Dasilva is one of three footballing brothers – he is twin to Rio and younger brother to Jay. He is of Welsh and Brazilian descent.

Career statistics

Honours 
Brentford B
 Middlesex Senior Cup: 2018–19

Oxford City
 Oxfordshire Senior Cup: 2021–22

Wales U16
 Victory Shield: 2014–15

References

External links
 
 

1999 births
Living people
English footballers
Black British sportspeople
Association football fullbacks
Wales youth international footballers
Wales under-21 international footballers
Welsh people of Brazilian descent
English people of Welsh descent
English people of Brazilian descent
England youth international footballers
Luton Town F.C. players
Chelsea F.C. players
Brentford F.C. players
HNK Šibenik players
Oxford City F.C. players
Hemel Hempstead Town F.C. players
Croatian Football League players
National League (English football) players
British expatriates in Croatia
English expatriate footballers
Welsh expatriate footballers
Expatriate footballers in Croatia
English expatriate sportspeople in Croatia
Royston Town F.C. players
Southern Football League players